The Council of Workers' and Soldiers' Delegates was established on 3 June 1917 at the Leeds Convention held in Leeds, England. The founding conference was attended by 1,150 delegates. It was inspired by the events of the Russian February Revolution.

When news of the February Revolution (8–12 March 1917) in Russia spread to the British Isles, it inspired the labour movement to celebrate the event. The first event was a meeting organised in the Royal Albert Hall, London, on 31 March. This was attended by 10,000 people with a further 5,000 outside, for whom there was no space.

The Leeds Convention established the organisation, which had the support of both the Independent Labour Party and the British Socialist Party.  However, a few months later, the Bolshevik October Revolution took place; the participants had different attitudes towards it, and the council collapsed.

The Leeds Convention

The Leeds Convention, originally to be held at the Albert Hall, Leeds but then moved to the Coliseum Theatre, was held on Sunday 3 June 1917.  It was organised by the United Socialist Council, a body which contained representatives of the British Socialist Party (BSP), the Independent Labour Party (ILP) and the Fabian Society, and was attended by 1,150 delegates from various political organisations, trades unions and pressure groups. The event was claimed to be a "Democratic Conference to establish Democracy in Great Britain" and "To Follow Russia" and four resolutions were passed - 1. hailing the Russian Revolution; 2. on foreign policy and war aims, calling for a negotiated end to the war; 3. on civil liberties, including calls for equal political rights, freedom of speech, and release of political and religious prisoners (including conscientious objectors); 4. to form Workmen's and Soldiers' Councils in Britain "for initiating and co-ordinating working-class activity". It heard messages of support from George Lansbury, Clifford Allen and the Executive of the Soldiers’ and Workmen’s Deputies in Petrograd.

Speakers
The convention was addressed by:

The organising committee was made up of Henry Alexander (B.S.P.), Charles Ammon, William Crawford Anderson, M.P., Charlotte Despard, Edwin C. Fairchild, Joseph Fineberg, Fred Jowett, M.P., George Lansbury, Ramsay MacDonald, MP., Tom Quelch, Robert Smillie, Philip Snowden, MP., and Robert Williams. 
The Joint Secretaries of the Convention were Albert Inkpin (B.S.P.) and Francis Johnson (I.L.P.). Others in attendance at the Leeds Convention included Ben Tillett, Fred Jowett, Arthur MacManus, J. T. Murphy, Margaret Bondfield and Alf Mattison.

See also
 Labour Parliament (1854)

References

External links
What Happened at Leeds, Report of conference proceedings from The Herald, 1917, republished in Nottingham : British Labour and the Russian Revolution: the Leeds Convention (introduced by Ken Coates), Nottingham: Bertrand Russell Peace Foundation for the Spokesman (1974), and also the centenary edition of this publication (2017), with additional material relating to the event, 
"The February Revolution and its impact in Britain", Warwick Modern Records Centre.
White, Stephen, "Soviets in Britain: The Leeds Convention of 1917", International Review of Social History, 19(2), (1974), pp. 165–193.
Pete Jackson, "The Leeds Convention of 1917", Socialist Review 425 (29 May 2017). 
Christian Hogsbjerg, "A most remarkable gathering",Socialist Review, 425 (31 May 2017)
Commemorative event to mark the centenary of the Leeds Convention in Leeds on 3 June 2017 at the Swarthmore Centre organized by the Ford-Maguire Society and Leeds Trades Council.
Pete Jackson, "The Russian Revolution and the British working class", International Socialism 156 (2017).

1917 establishments in England
British Socialist Party
Early Soviet republics
Independent Labour Party
Organizations established in 1917
United Kingdom in World War I